The Journal of Experimental Psychology: General is a peer-reviewed academic journal published by the American Psychological Association. It was established in 1975 as an independent section of the Journal of Experimental Psychology and covers research in experimental psychology. 

The journal has implemented the Transparency and Openness Promotion (TOP) Guidelines.  The TOP Guidelines provide structure to research planning and reporting and aim to make research more transparent, accessible, and reproducible. 

The journal may include articles on the following topics: 
 social processes 
 developmental processes 
 psychopathology 
 neuroscience 
 computational modeling

The current editor-in-chief is Nelson Cowan (University of Missouri). His predecessor was Isabel Gauthier (Vanderbilt University).

Abstracting and indexing 
The journal is abstracted and indexed by MEDLINE/PubMed and the Social Sciences Citation Index. According to the Journal Citation Reports, the journal has a 2021 impact factor of 4.913.

References

External links 
 

American Psychological Association academic journals
English-language journals
Publications established in 1975
Quarterly journals
Experimental psychology journals